The 2013 PSL Invitational was the inaugural tournament of the Philippine Super Liga of professional volleyball for its maiden season.  It was held from July 7, 2013 to July 28, 2013. The TMS-Philippine Army Lady Troopers emerged as the first PSL champion.

Participating teams

Classification round

|}

|}

Playoffs

Quarterfinals 

|}

Semifinals 

|}

5th place 

|}

3rd Place 

|}

Final 

|}

Final standing

Awards

Venues
PhilSports Arena
Filoil Flying V Arena
Mall of Asia Arena (semi-finals and finals)

Broadcast partner
Solar Sports

References

Philippine Super Liga
PSL
PSL